RAAF Base Williamtown  is a Royal Australian Air Force (RAAF) military air base located  north of the coastal city of Newcastle ( by road) in the local government area of Port Stephens, in New South Wales, Australia. The base serves as the headquarters to both the Air Combat Group and the Surveillance and Response Group of the RAAF. The military base shares its runway facilities with Newcastle Airport.

A number of the buildings and other facilities on the base are listed on the Commonwealth Heritage List.

History 

RAAF Station Williamtown was established on 15 February 1941 to provide protection for the strategic port and steel manufacturing facilities of the Hunter Region. The base was initially served by four runways, each  in length to meet the needs of the Williamtown Flying School. The School consisted of 62 buildings which accommodated 366 officers and men.

A number of Australian Empire Air Training Scheme squadrons were formed at Williamtown before proceeding overseas and No. 4 Operational Training Unit was located at Williamtown from October 1942 until the unit was disbanded in April 1944. Following World War II, Williamtown was retained as the RAAF's main fighter base and was equipped with squadrons of Gloster Meteor and CAC Sabre fighters.

In 1961, the squadron of Meteors were replaced with the Dassault Mirage aircraft. On-base facilities were gradually expanded post war and through until the late 1960s.

In 1983, the role of Williamtown was upgraded to a tactical fighter base in preparation of the replacement of the Mirages with 75 F/A-18 Hornets in 1989. The following year, Williamtown became headquarters for the Tactical Fighter group and acquired new headquarter buildings, hangars, workshops, stores, medical facilities and a base chapel.

Current base activity 
 RAAF Williamtown employed approximately 3,500 personnel, including military, civilians and contractors, and generated A$150 million per annum by way of salaries in the Hunter Region economy.

Williamtown is home to F/A-18 Hornet fighters (operated by No. 2 Operational Conversion Unit, No. 3 Squadron and No. 77 Squadron), BAE Hawk 127 Lead-In Fighters (operated by No. 76 Squadron), E-7A Wedgetail airborne early warning and control aircraft (operated by No. 2 Squadron) and Pilatus PC-9 forward air control aircraft (operated by No. 4 Squadron). It is also home to the Australian Defence Force Warfare Centre and Surveillance and Response Group RAAF.

RAAF Base Williamtown has most of the facilities one would expect to find in a small town, including sporting fields, recreation facilities, cinema and a fortnightly newspaper highlighting activities around the Base and outside community. RAAF Williamtown is the home to Fighter World, a museum dedicated to Australian fighter aircraft.

In 2014, the Australian Government announced that Williamtown will be the home base for the F-35 Lightning II Joint Strike Fighters; the first of which arrived in December 2018, and enter service with the RAAF in 2020. Redevelopment works to prepare the base for the F-35, including a 2000 ft runway extension, began in January 2015. This runway extension will allow fighters to take off without the use of their noisy afterburners, minimising noise for local communities.

The use of firefighting chemicals over a sustained period has resulted in contamination of the groundwater in the area surrounding the base, with residents initiating a class action lawsuit and expressing ongoing concern in national media over the impact on their properties. Nationally, there are 90 sites impacted by PFAS contamination, with more internationally.

Units 
The following units are located at RAAF Base Williamtown:

See also 
 United States Army Air Forces in Australia (World War II)
 List of airports in New South Wales
 List of Royal Australian Air Force installations

References

External links 

 

Royal Australian Air Force bases
Port Stephens Council
Airfields of the United States Army Air Forces Air Transport Command in the South West Pacific Theater
Military establishments in the Hunter Region
Airports in New South Wales
1941 establishments in Australia
Airports established in 1941
Military installations established in 1941